Melitara dentata, the North American cactus moth, is a moth of the family Pyralidae. The species was first described by Augustus Radcliffe Grote in 1876. It is native to western North America, where it is widespread from Alberta to southern Arizona and central Texas. It is an introduced species in Hawaii.

The wingspan is 32–50 mm. Adults have a stocky, grayish body with long and narrow gray forewings, often with a whitish costal margin. The forewings have a row of dark spots near the tip with one spot between each pair of veins and a distinct (but often weak) double zigzag cross band, a distinct black discal spot and a weak, dark angled cross band near the wing base. The hindwings are broad and white, mostly with grayish margins.

There is one generation per year.

The larvae feed on Opuntia species, including Opuntia fragilis, Opuntia macrorhiza and Opuntia polyacantha. Pupation takes place in the silk cases.

External links

Simonsen, Thomas J. & Brown, Richard L. "Melitara dentata (Grote)". Cactus Moths and Their Relatives (Pyralidae: Phycitinae). Mississippi State University. Retrieved November 11, 2020.

Moths described in 1876
Phycitini